"Hey Mama" is a song by American musical group the Black Eyed Peas with additional vocals provided by British reggae singer Tippa Irie. It was released in 2004 as the third single from their 2003 album, Elephunk, and became a top-ten hit in 14 countries, including Australia, Canada, Germany, New Zealand, Switzerland, and the United Kingdom.

Recording and release
The song was recorded from March 7 to 8, 2003, at The Stewchia in Los Feliz, Los Angeles. The single version of the song differs from the album version in that it cuts a verse from the end of the song and replaces it with an entirely new one performed by members Taboo and apl.de.ap (both of whom did not perform on the original album version), changes some of the lyrics, and slightly alters the instrumentals.

"Hey Mama" reached  3 in Switzerland and No. 4 in Australia, Austria, and New Zealand. In the United Kingdom, it peaked No. 6, becoming their third top-ten hit there, and was also a success in Canada and the United States, reaching No. 9 on the Canadian Singles Chart and No. 23 on the US Billboard Hot 100.

The song was used to promote the 2004 film Garfield: The Movie which stars Bill Murray voicing the titular role. In the film, while not included on its soundtrack album, Garfield has a dance-off with Odie to the song, which was used in the advertisements for the film.

Music video

The music video features 3 main locations, the first shown being a psychedelic limbo, where the Black Eyed Peas do breakdancing and the main verse of the song is sung. The color scheme is mostly yellow, red, brown and off-white. The second is the vertically-black-and-white striped canvas-room. A few parts are sung in here, but the main one is the one featuring Fergie. The third is the club dance scene, which has many background characters dancing.

Two versions of the video were made, one with apl.de.ap's and Taboo's rap verses and one without. Both versions add an instrumental breakdown to the end of the song.

Track listings
UK CD1 and Australian CD single
 "Hey Mama" – 3:48
 "Positivity" (live from House of Blues, Chicago) – 4:58
 "Release" (live from House of Blues, Chicago) – 3:07
 "Hey Mama" (video)

UK CD2 and European CD single
 "Hey Mama" – 3:48
 "Positivity" (live from House of Blues, Chicago) – 4:58

UK 12-inch single
A1. "Hey Mama" – 3:46
B1. "Hey Mama" (instrumental) – 3:30
B2. "The Boogie That Be" – 5:12

Personnel
Personnel are lifted from the Elephunk album booklet.

The Black Eyed Peas
 will.i.am – vocals, Moog synthesizer, drum programming, Wurlitzer electric piano, production, engineering
 Fergie – vocals
 Taboo – vocals (only on the single/radio version)
 apl.de.ap – vocals (only on the single/radio version)

Additional musicians
 Tippa Irie – vocals
 Dante Santiago – backing vocals

Production personnel
 Tony Maserati – mixing

Charts

Weekly charts

Year-end charts

Certifications

Release history

References

2003 songs
2004 singles
Black Eyed Peas songs
Garfield (film series)
Interscope Records singles
Music videos directed by Fatima Robinson
Song recordings produced by will.i.am
Songs written by will.i.am